Aleksandr Sergeyevich Sobolev (born 30 March 1995) is a Russian former professional footballer who played as a forward.

Club career
Sobolev made his debut in the Russian Premier League on 8 November 2013 for FC Ural Sverdlovsk Oblast in a game against FC Rostov.

External links

References

Living people
1995 births
Sportspeople from Yekaterinburg
Russian footballers
Association football forwards
FC Ural Yekaterinburg players
Russian Premier League players